This is a list of Roman governors of Upper Moesia (Moesia Superior), located where the modern state of Serbia currently is. This province was created from the province of Moesia by the Emperor Domitian in AD 86.

See also 
 List of Roman governors of Moesia
 List of Roman governors of Lower Moesia

References 
 Legates for AD 86 to 97 are based on Werner Eck, "Jahres- und Provinzialfasten der senatorischen Statthalter von 69/70 bis 138/139", Chiron, 12 (1982), pp. 281-362; 13 (1983), pp. 147-237.
 Legates for AD 100 to 138 are based on Werner Eck and Andrea Pangerl, "Moesia und seine Truppen. Neue Diplome für Moesia und Moesia superior", Chiron, 8 (2008), p. 377
 Legates for AD 143 to 177 are based on Géza Alföldy, Konsulat und Senatorenstand unter der Antoninen (Bonn: Rudolf Habelt Verlag, 1977), pp. 230-233.
 Legates for A.D. 218 to 238 are based on Paul M.M. Leunissen, Konsuln und konsulare in der zeit von Commodus bis Severus Alexander: 180-235 n. Chr. (Amsterdam: Verlag J.C. Gieben, 1989), pp. 254f.

Notes 

 
Moesia, Upper